is a passenger railway station in the town of  Kōya, Ito District, Wakayama Prefecture, Japan, operated by the private railway company Nankai Electric Railway.

Lines
Kōyasan  Station is the upper terminus of the funicular  Nankai Cable Line, and is located 0.8 kilometers from the lower terminus of the line at Gokurakubashi Station.

Station layout
The station consists of one bay platform. The station is staffed.

Platforms

Adjacent stations

History
Kōyasan Station opened on June 28, 1930.

Passenger statistics
In fiscal 2019, the station was used by an average of 2010 passengers daily (boarding passengers only).

Surrounding area
In front of the station, there is a Nankai Rinkan Bus stop and a taxi stand.

Buses 
Passengers who get off the station aren't able to walk to Mount Koya due to the road which connects the station with Mount Koya exclusively for the bus. So, passengers who want to go to Mount Koya must ride on the buses.

Reservation Bus

See also
List of railway stations in Japan

References

External links

 Kōyasan Station Official Site

Railway stations in Japan opened in 1930
Railway stations in Wakayama Prefecture
Kōya, Wakayama